Jaswinder Bhalla (born 4 May 1960) is an Indian actor and comedian who works in Punjabi cinema. He started his professional career as a comedian in 1988 with Chankata 88 and became actor with film Dulla Bhatti. He is best known for his comedy series Chankatta and comedy roles in various Punjabi films. He is famous for always using taglines in his movies, and bringing a comic touch to movies through them. He also performs in stage acts and has done tours of Canada and Australia for his stage show Naughty Baba in Town.

Childhood
Jaswinder Bhalla was born on 4 May 1960 in the city of Ludhiana. His father Master Bahadur Singh Bhalla was a primary school teacher in village Barmalipur . He got his basic education from Senior Secondary School Doraha.

Education and career
He did his B.Sc. and M.Sc. from Punjab Agricultural University, and his Ph.D. from Chaudhry Charan Singh University, Meerut. He began his career as an Assistant Professor in PAU, and was serving as a Professor and Head, Department of Extension Education when he retired from active service on 31 May 2020

Comedy career
He started performing on Independence day and Republic day shows  Jaswinder Bhalla and two of schoolmates got selected for All India Radio in 1975.
As a student at Punjab Agricultural University, Jaswinder Bhalla had done comedy performances in university programmes. He started his professional career in 1988 along with co-performer Bal Mukund Sharma with audio cassette Chhankata 1988. Bal Mukund Sharma and Jaswinder Bhalla were classmates in Punjab Agriculture University. Word Chankata originated from the college level annual show performed by Bhalla and Sharma in PAU. They were noticed by Doordarshan Kendra, Jalandhar while performing in Professor Mohan Singh Mela (cultural festival) on personal backing of Punjabi author Jagdev Singh Jassowal. He has released over 27 audio and video albums of Chankata series. Apart from Bal Mukund Sharma, Neelu Sharma has also been part of Chhankata series. Starting with Chhankata 2002, series is also realised as video cassette.

Popular characters
In his Chhankata series, he portrayed many characters carefully chosen from all walks of Punjabi society. One of the main characters is Chacha (Uncle) Chatur Singh, who is an old villager and talks about Punjab's politics, differences between rural and urban life, and tells jokes from all walks of life. Another character he portrays is Bhana, a youngster from Chatur Singh's village who has emigrated to USA and appears in the Chhankata as NRI. JB, another character portrayed by Jaswinder Bhalla, is the son of Chatur Singh. Another notable character is Taya Fumhan Singh.

Film career
Jaswinder has worked in Punjabi feature films like Mahaul Theek Hai, Jeeja Ji, Jihne Mera Dil Luteya, Power cut, Kabaddi Once Again, Apan Phir Milange, Mel Kara De Rabba, Carry On Jatta, Jatt and Juliet, Jatt Airways. In some Punjabi films he always speak with different Takia Klams. Such as Mein Taa Bhannduu Bullan Naal Akhrote, Je Chandigarh Dhaijoo Pinda Warga Taa Rehjooo or Dhillon Ne Kaalaa Cot Aiven Ni Payeya. He said through his art, he highlights social evils like female foeticide, drugs and unemployment.

Controversy
In his album Chankatta 2003, he was alleged by certain ragi jathas of making mockery of them and raised strong objections to his album. An apology was issued by the artists and producer of the album. His latest album Mithe Pochey also faced ire of Nambardaars of various villages in Punjab for his satire on them. He was allegedly assaulted by Punjab government official due to his satire on government.

Personal life
He is married to Parmdeep Bhalla who is a Fine Arts teacher. He has a son named Pukhraj Bhalla, who is studying B.tech in Audio Visuals from Punjabi University, Patiala. Pukhraj has also appeared in some of the Chhankata cassettes since 2002 and has performed excellent roles in some Punjabi films as well. He has a daughter named Ashpreet Kaur who is married in Norway. He is good friends with Balmukund Sharma, who appears as Bhateej in the Chhankata series.

Filmography

References

External links
 
 

Living people
1960 births
Academic staff of Punjab Agricultural University
Indian male voice actors
Punjabi people
21st-century Indian male actors
20th-century Indian male actors
Indian Sikhs
Male actors in Punjabi cinema
People from Ludhiana district
Indian male comedians